Hebron High School is a  four-star public high school located in Hebron, Indiana, U.S.A.  The school is operated by the MSD of Boone Township, also known as Hebron Schools. As of the 2018–2019 school year, there were 375 students enrolled. The student:faculty ratio is approximately 10:1.

Athletics

Hebron High school's team name is the Hawks. They operate within the Porter County Conference.

See also
 List of high schools in Indiana

References

External links
Hebron High School

Public high schools in Indiana
Schools in Porter County, Indiana